The 1992–93 Elitserien was the 59th season of the top division of Swedish handball. 12 teams competed in the league. The league was split into an autumn league and a spring league. The eight highest placed teams in the autumn league qualified for the spring league. Redbergslids IK won the regular season and also won the playoffs to claim their 13th Swedish title.

League tables

Autumn

Spring

Playoffs

Quarterfinals
Ystads IF–IFK Skövde 19–13, 27–25 (Ystads IF won series 2–0)
HK Drott–IF Saab 23–18, 27–19 (HK Drott won series 2–0)

Semifinals
Redbergslids IK–HK Drott 20–19, 21–25, 21–17 (Redbergslids IK won series 2–1)
IK Sävehof–Ystads IF 27–15, 31–20 (IK Sävehof won series 2–0)

Finals
Redbergslids IK–IK Sävehof 21–21, 23–19, 19–23, 15–20, 21–16 (Redbergslids IK won series 3–2)

References 

Swedish handball competitions